Nina Qullu (Aymara nina fire, qullu mountain, "fire mountain", also spelled Nina Kkellu, Nina Kollu) is a mountain in the Bolivian Andes which reaches a height of approximately . It is located in the La Paz Department, Loayza Province, Luribay Municipality. The Qullpa Jawira ("salpeter river", Khollpa Jahuira) flows along its eastern slope.

References 

Mountains of La Paz Department (Bolivia)